{{DISPLAYTITLE:L-Fuculokinase}}

L-Fuculokinase is an enzyme that catalyzes the chemical reaction

 ATP + L-fuculose (L-fuculokinase)  ADP + L-fuculose-1-phosphate

Thus, the two substrates of this enzyme are ATP and L-fuculose, whereas its two products are ADP and L-fuculose-1-phosphate.

The gene name used for the gene that encodes L-fuculokinase is fucK.

L-Fuculokinase belongs to the family of transferases, specifically those transferring phosphorus-containing groups (phosphotransferases) with an alcohol group as acceptor. The systematic name of this enzyme class is ATP:L-fuculose 1-phosphotransferase. Other names in common use include L-fuculokinase (phosphorylating), and L-fuculose kinase. This enzyme participates in fructose and mannose metabolism.

References

EC 2.7.1
Enzymes of unknown structure